Balakürd (also, Balakyurd) is a village in the Goranboy Rayon of Azerbaijan.  The village forms part of the municipality of Qızılhacılı.

References 

Populated places in Goranboy District